Herbert George McPhail ( 11 February 1878 –  20 September 1951) was a member of both the Queensland Legislative Council and Queensland Legislative Assembly.

Early life

McPhail was born at Brisbane, Queensland, to Robert McPhail and his wife Fanny (née Challenger) and was educated at Brisbane Normal School.

Political career
McPhail entered politics at the 1915 state election, winning the seat of Windsor for the Labor and defeating the sitting member, Hugh Macrossan. He held the seat for one term before losing to Charles Taylor in 1918.

When the Labour Party starting forming governments in Queensland, it found much of its legislation being blocked by a hostile Council, where members had been appointed for life by successive conservative governments. After a failed referendum in May 1917, Premier Ryan tried a new tactic, and later that year advised the Governor, Sir Hamilton John Goold-Adams, to appoint thirteen new members whose allegiance lay with Labour to the Council.

In 1920, the new Premier Ted Theodore appointed a further fourteen new members to the Council with McPhail amongst the appointees. He served for seven months before resigning in September 1920 only to be reappointed fourteen months later and remaining in the Council until it was abolished in March 1922.

Personal life
McPhail died in Brisbane in September 1951 and was cremated at Mount Thompson Crematorium.

References

Members of the Queensland Legislative Assembly
Members of the Queensland Legislative Council
1878 births
1951 deaths
Australian Labor Party members of the Parliament of Queensland
People from Brisbane